The  was a class of patrol boat (picket boat) of the Imperial Japanese Navy (IJN), serving during World War II. 280 vessels were planned under the Maru Sen Programme (Ship # 2121–2400), however, only 27 vessels were completed before the end of the war.

Background
 During the war, Japan commandeered a large number of fishing boats for picket boat duty, with the primary duty of observing the sea to the east of the mainland. Their primary duty was to provide early warning of any U.S. Task Force attempting to close the Japan mainland. Some of the picket trawlers accomplished their duties, but this was typically by means of failing to respond to hails after encountering the enemy. the IJN decided to build a specialized picket boat to replace the large number of vessels lost in the course of duty.
 The IJN intended to build 280 picket boats, however, the IJN was not able to procure sufficient wood to build the full number. The IJN built only 27 vessels before the end of the war. Those that survived war played an active part in the post-war minesweeping effort (primarily of magnetic mines) in company with the No.1-class auxiliary submarine chasers.

Ships in class
Auxiliary Patrol Boat No.1, completed on 28 March 1945, survived war.
Auxiliary Patrol Boat No.2, completed on 20 May 1945, survived war.
Auxiliary Patrol Boat No.3, completed on 5 August 1945, survived war.
Auxiliary Patrol Boat No.4, incomplete, rebuilt to fishing boat in postwar.
Ship No.2125 to No.2144, cancelled in 1945.
Auxiliary Patrol Boat No.25, completed on 27 April 1945, survived war, sunk by rough weather on 18 September 1945.
Auxiliary Patrol Boat No.26, completed on 2 August 1945, survived war, rebuilt to fishing boat in postwar.
Auxiliary Patrol Boat No.27, incomplete, scrapped in postwar.
Ship No.2148 to No.2150, cancelled in 1945.
Auxiliary Patrol Boat No.31, completed on 29 July 1945, survived war, transferred to Japan Maritime Safety Agency and renamed MS 18 on 1 May 1948.
Auxiliary Patrol Boat No.32, incomplete, rebuilt to fishing boat in postwar.
Auxiliary Patrol Boat No.33, 90% complete, rebuilt to fishing boat in postwar.
Auxiliary Patrol Boat No.34, 80% complete, rebuilt to fishing boat in postwar.
Ship No.2155 and 2156, cancelled in 1945.
Auxiliary Patrol Boat No.37, completed on 2 June 1945, sunk by air raid on 18 July 1945 at Yokosuka.
Auxiliary Patrol Boat No.38, 90% complete, scrapped in postwar.
Ship No.2159 to No.2173, cancelled in 1945.
Auxiliary Patrol Boat No.54, completed on 5 August, survived war, filled and sunk in postwar.
Auxiliary Patrol Boat No.55, 95% complete.
Ship No.2176 to No.2183, cancelled in 1945.
Auxiliary Patrol Boat No.64, incomplete, rebuilt to fishing boat in postwar.
Auxiliary Patrol Boat No.65, 90% complete, rebuilt to fishing boat in postwar.
Auxiliary Patrol Boat No.66, 80% complete.
Ship No.2187 to No.2203, cancelled in 1945.
Auxiliary Patrol Boat No.84, completed on 7 June 1945, survived war, transferred to Japan Maritime Safety Agency and renamed MS 19 on 1 May 1948.
Auxiliary Patrol Boat No.85, 95% complete, rebuilt to fishing boat in postwar.
Auxiliary Patrol Boat No.86, 70% complete.
Ship No.2207 to No.2209, cancelled in 1945.
Auxiliary Patrol Boat No.90, completed on 11 April 1945, survived war, struck a naval mine and sunk in postwar.
Auxiliary Patrol Boat No.91, 99% complete.
Auxiliary Patrol Boat No.92, 95% complete.
Auxiliary Patrol Boat No.93, 80% complete.
Ship No.2214 to No.2229, cancelled in 1945.
Auxiliary Patrol Boat No.110, incomplete, sunk by air raid on 18 July 1945 at Yokosuka.
Auxiliary Patrol Boat No.111, 99% complete.
Ship No.2232 to No.2241, cancelled in 1945.
Auxiliary Patrol Boat No.122, incomplete, sunk by air raid on 18 July 1945 at Yokosuka.
Auxiliary Patrol Boat No.123, incomplete.
Ship No.2244 to No.2252, cancelled in 1945.
Auxiliary Patrol Boat No.134, completed on 26 February 1945, survived war, transferred to Japan Maritime Safety Agency and renamed MS 20 on 1 May 1948.
Auxiliary Patrol Boat No.135, completed on 23 May 1945, survived war, transferred to Japan Maritime Safety Agency and renamed MS 21 on 1 May 1948.
Auxiliary Patrol Boat No.136, completed on 5 June 1945, survived war, transferred to Japan Maritime Safety Agency and renamed MS 22 on 1 May 1948.
Auxiliary Patrol Boat No.137, completed on 15 July 1945, survived war, sunk by rough weather on 18 April 1946.
Auxiliary Patrol Boat No.138, completed on 11 August 1945, survived war, transferred to Japan Maritime Safety Agency and renamed MS 23 on 1 May 1948.
Auxiliary Patrol Boat No.139, incomplete, transferred to Japan Maritime Safety Agency and renamed MS 24 on 1 May 1948.
Auxiliary Patrol Boat No.140, 90% complete.
Ship No.2261 to No.2271, cancelled in 1945.
Auxiliary Patrol Boat No.152, completed on 23 May 1945, survived war, transferred to Japan Maritime Safety Agency and renamed MS 25 on 1 May 1948.
Auxiliary Patrol Boat No.153, completed on 23 July 1945, survived war, transferred to Japan Maritime Safety Agency and renamed MS 26 on 1 May 1948.
Auxiliary Patrol Boat No.154, incomplete, transferred to Japan Maritime Safety Agency and renamed MS 27 on 1 May 1948.
Auxiliary Patrol Boat No.155, 90% complete.
Auxiliary Patrol Boat No.156, incomplete.
Ship No.2277 to No.2282, cancelled in 1945.
Auxiliary Patrol Boat No.163, completed on 10 February 1945, survived war, struck a naval mine and sunk on 22 August 1945.
Auxiliary Patrol Boat No.164, completed on 2 March 1945, agrounded on 30 May 1945, later scrapped.
Auxiliary Patrol Boat No.165, completed on 15 May 1945, survived war, filled and sunk in postwar.
Auxiliary Patrol Boat No.166, completed on 23 July 1945, sunk by air raid on 12 August 1945 off Onomichi.
Ship No.2287 to No.2292, cancelled in 1945.
Auxiliary Patrol Boat No.173, completed on 26 March 1945, struck a naval mine and sunk on 29 March 1945, later refloated and scrapped.
Auxiliary Patrol Boat No.174, completed on 10 May 1945, survived war.
Auxiliary Patrol Boat No.175, completed on 23 June 1945, survived war, transferred to Japan Maritime Safety Agency and renamed MS 28 on 1 May 1948.
Auxiliary Patrol Boat No.176, incomplete, sunk by rough weather on 18 April 1946.
Auxiliary Patrol Boat No.177, incomplete, burned by air raid on 4 July 1945.
Auxiliary Patrol Boat No.178, incomplete, burned by air raid on 4 July 1945.
Auxiliary Patrol Boat No.179, completed on 20 May 1945, survived war, transferred to Japan Maritime Safety Agency and renamed MS 29 on 1 May 1948.
Auxiliary Patrol Boat No.180, incomplete, filled and sunk in postwar.
Auxiliary Patrol Boat No.181, incomplete.
Ship No.2302 to No.2310, cancelled in 1945.
Auxiliary Patrol Boat No.191, completed on 27 March 1945, survived war, transferred to Japan Maritime Safety Agency and renamed MS 30 on 1 May 1948.
Auxiliary Patrol Boat No.192, completed on 27 July 1945, agrounded on 27 October 1945, later scrapped.
Auxiliary Patrol Boat No.193, 70% complete, sunk by typhoon on 18 September 1945.
Ship No.2314 to No.2400, cancelled in 1945.

See also
Maritime Safety Agency
Radar picket
Second Bureau of the Demobilization Ministry

Bibliography

, History of Pacific War Vol.37, Support vessels of the Imperial Japanese Forces, Gakken (Japan), June 2002, 
Ships of the World special issue Vol.45, Escort Vessels of the Imperial Japanese Navy, Kaijinsha, (Japan), February 1996
Model Art Extra No.340, Drawings of Imperial Japanese Naval Vessels Part-1, Model Art Co. Ltd. (Japan), October 1989
The Maru Special, Japanese Naval Vessels No.49, Japanese submarine chasers, Ushio Shobō (Japan), March 1981

Footnotes

Ships of the Imperial Japanese Navy
World War II naval ships of Japan
Patrol boat classes
Naval trawlers
Warning systems
Japan campaign
Japan Coast Guard
Japan Maritime Self-Defense Force